Verba is a surname. Notable people with the surname include:

Ross Verba (born 1973), American football player
Sidney Verba (1932–2019), American academic

See also